The World Cup and European Championship, are the primary competitive tournaments the Norway national football team enters. The finals of both tournaments held every four years in alternate even numbered years. Excluding the tournament years in which Norway either did not enter or failed to qualify for the finals, the Norway national team has nominated the following squads of players to compete in the finals:

1938 World Cup

 Progress: Round of 16

Head coach: Asbjørn Halvorsen

1994 World Cup

 Progress: Group stage

Head coach: Egil Olsen

1998 World Cup

 Progress: Round of 16

Head coach: Egil Olsen

2000 European Championship

 Progress: Group stage

Manager: Nils Johan Semb

See also
 List of Norway international footballers (by years/caps/goals) (25 caps and over)

References

S
squads
squads